Tender Age is a 2000 Russian drama film directed by Sergei Solovyov.

Plot
The story of one man growing up in a new market-mafia social life, the story of his love for the daughter of his parents' friends, who becomes a famous Parisian top model, relationships with whom go through the hero's life.

Cast 
 Dmitri Solovyov as Ivan Gromov
 Sergei Garmash as Semyon Bespalchikov
 Valentin Gaft as Saledon Sr.
 Kirill Lavrov as Grandfather
 Ludmila Savelyeva as Grandmother
 Nikolai Chindyajkin as Psychiatrist
 Andrey Panin as captain Okunkov

References

External links 

2000 drama films
2000 films
Russian drama films
Films directed by Sergei Solovyov
Films scored by Boris Grebenshchikov
Films produced by Nikita Mikhalkov